Mérida Province  may refer to:
 Mérida Province (Spanish Empire), a province of the New Kingdom of Granada
 Mérida Province (Venezuela), a province of Gran Colombia

Province name disambiguation pages